Defending champion Roger Federer defeated Andre Agassi in the final, 6–3, 2–6, 7–6(7–1), 6–1 to win the men's singles tennis title at the 2005 US Open. It was his second US Open title and sixth major title overall. This was Agassi's last appearance in a major final.

This was the first US Open in which future champions Novak Djokovic, Andy Murray and Stan Wawrinka competed in the main draw. Noteworthy in this tournament was a strong performance by American men, despite 2003 champion and former world No. 1 Andy Roddick losing in the first round. Wildcard James Blake reached the quarterfinals, upsetting world No. 2 Rafael Nadal in the third round before losing to Agassi. Robby Ginepri, whose run was enhanced by Roddick's early defeat, reached the semifinals and also lost to Agassi.

This was also the last major tournament for former world No. 6 and French Open champion Albert Costa.

Seeds

The seeded players are listed below. Roger Federer is the champion; others show the round in which they were eliminated.

Qualifying draw

Draw

Finals

Top half

Section 1

Section 2

Section 3

Section 4

Bottom half

Section 5

Section 6

Section 7

Section 8

External links
 Association of Tennis Professionals (ATP) – 2005 US Open Men's Singles draw
2005 US Open – Men's draws and results at the International Tennis Federation

Men's Singles
US Open (tennis) by year – Men's singles